The Kaihu River is a river of the far north of New Zealand's North Island. It flows southeast from just south of Waipoua Forest, reaching the Wairoa River at the town of Dargaville.

See also
List of rivers of New Zealand

References

Rivers of the Northland Region
Rivers of New Zealand
Kaipara Harbour catchment